Diadelia x-fascioides is a species of beetle in the family Cerambycidae. It was described by Breuning in 1971. It is known from Madagascar.

References

Diadelia
Beetles described in 1971